Thi Wang railway station is a railway station located in Thi Wang Subdistrict, Thung Song District, Nakhon Si Thammarat.

Train services 
 Rapid train No. 167 / 168 Bangkok–Kantang–Bangkok

References 
 
 

Railway stations in Thailand